Eastbourne is a suburb of Lower Hutt, a part of Wellington, New Zealand. Lying beside the sea, it is a popular local tourist destination via car from Petone or from ferry crossings from central Wellington.  An outer suburb, it lies on the eastern shore of Wellington Harbour, five kilometres south of the main Lower Hutt urban area and directly across the harbour from the Miramar Peninsula in Wellington city. A narrow exposed coastal road connects it with the rest of Lower Hutt via the Eastern Bays and the industrial suburb of Seaview. It is named for Eastbourne in England, another seaside town known as a destination for day-trips.

In the hills bordering Eastbourne there is mainly native bush and trees. With a locally administered possum-eradication programme, much of the native bush has regenerated, including red-flowering northern rātā trees. The bush has numerous tracks running to and from them, including a track along the entire bays hills ridge. With many settlers originating from Stromboli, an island near Sicily, the suburb has an Italian heritage similar to several other suburbs in Wellington; this is expressed particularly in its architecture.

History 
The suburb's origins lie in pre-colonial times, with local Māori Iwi having several Kāinga and Pā in the area for hundreds of years, in the bays and the raised headlands respectively. These settlements were located in the bays north of the suburb's centre, such as Point Howard and the Lowry, Rona and Days Bays. These settlements were essential, as they blocked out invasion from the neighbouring iwi in the Wairarapa, Ngāti Kahungunu. Raids were a common affair, and forced local Māori to always be vigilant.

European settlement increased after the devastating 1855 Wairarapa earthquake, because the Waiwhetu river in Seaview was lowered, along with the raising of the shore of Wellington Harbour by 2 metres. Eastbourne's Italian heritage began with the settlement of Rona Bay (originally known as Brown's Bay) by Italians Bartolo and Italia Russo 1892. Renaming it after themselves as Russo Bay, the Russos, originally from Stromboli, they established a hotel and began horticultural and fishing industries. They prompted many relatives and friends to also emigrate, propelling Eastbourne into an elaborate little Italian New Zealander stronghold. 

Prior to its amalgamation into Lower Hutt, the Borough of Eastbourne comprised a separate town, with its own council and civic administration. The Eastbourne Community Board, a remnant of the former town council, remains vocal on local issues. A local bus station still bears the "Borough of Eastbourne" name.

Demographics

Eastbourne had a population of 2,709 at the 2018 New Zealand census, a decrease of 12 people (-0.4%) since the 2013 census, and an increase of 9 people (0.3%) since the 2006 census. There were 1,089 households. There were 1,308 males and 1,401 females, giving a sex ratio of 0.93 males per female. The median age was 46.2 years (compared with 37.4 years nationally), with 534 people (19.7%) aged under 15 years, 324 (12.0%) aged 15 to 29, 1,317 (48.6%) aged 30 to 64, and 531 (19.6%) aged 65 or older.

Ethnicities were 95.3% European/Pākehā, 5.4% Māori, 1.6% Pacific peoples, 2.8% Asian, and 2.1% other ethnicities (totals add to more than 100% since people could identify with multiple ethnicities).

The proportion of people born overseas was 26.0%, compared with 27.1% nationally.

Although some people objected to giving their religion, 54.5% had no religion, 36.8% were Christian, 0.6% were Hindu, 0.1% were Muslim, 0.6% were Buddhist and 2.8% had other religions.

Of those at least 15 years old, 990 (45.5%) people had a bachelor or higher degree, and 153 (7.0%) people had no formal qualifications. The median income was $45,600, compared with $31,800 nationally. The employment status of those at least 15 was that 1,074 (49.4%) people were employed full-time, 375 (17.2%) were part-time, and 69 (3.2%) were unemployed.

Culture and features today 
Eastbourne's culture involves its laid-back, sunny atmosphere, small restaurants, heritage homes and remoteness that invokes a curiosity among other Wellingtonians, who have flocked there for summer day trips since the 19th century.

A regular trans-harbour ferry service connects Wellington and Eastbourne, docking at the Days Bay wharf in Eastbourne and at Queen's Wharf close to down-town Wellington. The ferry started in 1886, became daily in 1901, was bought by Eastbourne Borough Council in 1913 and stopped between 1948 and 1989.

The southern terminus of buses in Eastbourne is the Bus Barn, or Eastbourne Borough Council Omnibus Service Garage, which was formally opened on 24 May 1939. It has had a Historic Place Category 2 listing (Number 7644) since 8 February 2006. It was in the news in March 2022 when a double deck bus tried to enter its low doorway.

Eastbourne has three local primary schools: Muritai School, San Antonio School and (in Days Bay) Wellesley College.

At the end of Eastbourne beyond Burdan's gate there is a pedestrian-only coastal road (unsealed) which extends out to the Wellington Harbour entrance heads, where there are three lighthouses. This area, popular with cyclists, provides access to East Harbour Regional Park.

The hills surrounding Eastbourne provide important habitat for indigenous biodiversity and contain some of New Zealand's rarest and most-endangered plant species.

Gallery

Education

Notable residents
Ashley Bloomfield (1966–present), New Zealand public health official. 
Margaret Magill (1888–1962), teacher and school principal; served as deputy mayor of Eastbourne
Mimie Wood (1888–1979), secretary, accountant and librarian for the Royal Society of New Zealand; lived in Eastbourne from 1920

References

External links
Local Eastbourne Site

Populated places in the Wellington Region
Suburbs of Lower Hutt
Populated places around the Wellington Harbour